Duncan Stephen Walker (November 11, 1841 – June 3, 1912) was a Union Army lieutenant colonel and assistant adjutant general during the American Civil War. He resigned his commission on May 12, 1865. In 1866, he was nominated and confirmed for appointment as a brevet  brigadier general, to rank from March 13, 1865.

The grandson of Revolutionary War veteran and U.S. District Judge Jonathan Hoge Walker and son of U.S. Senator Robert John Walker (1801-1869) and his wife Mary Blechynden Bache Walker (1808-1873), he was educated at Georgetown University, Lafayette College, and Princeton University. Initially commissioned as a captain of volunteers, Walker served as an assistant adjutant-general during the American Civil War, on the staffs of Major Gen. Nathaniel P. Banks and later Brig. Gen. William H. Emory and Major Gen. Winfield Scott Hancock.  

On February 21, 1866, President Andrew Johnson nominated Walker for appointment to the grade of brevet brigadier general of volunteers, to rank from March 13, 1865, and the United States Senate confirmed the appointment on April 10, 1866.

He is buried at Arlington National Cemetery.

He was the great-great-grandson of Benjamin Franklin.

References

External links
 Mary Blechynden Bache Walker (mother)  at Findagrave.com
 Richard Bache, Jr (grandfather) at Findagrave.com
 Sarah "Sally" Franklin Bache (great grandmother) at Findagrave.com
 Benjamin Franklin (great-great grandfather) at Findagrave.com

See also

List of American Civil War brevet generals (Union)

Union Army colonels
1841 births
1912 deaths
Franklin family
Georgetown University alumni
Lafayette College alumni
Princeton University alumni